The Netherlands Football League Championship 1913–1914 was contested by 24 teams participating in three divisions. The national champion would be determined by a play-off featuring the winners of the eastern, southern and western football division of the Netherlands. HVV Den Haag won this year's championship by beating Vitesse Arnhem and Willem II.

New entrants
Eerste Klasse East:
Robur et Velocitas
Eerste Klasse South: (new Division)
MVV Maastricht
VVV Venlo
Willem II
Bredania/'t Zesde (returning after two seasons of absence, having played in the Western Division)
RKVV Wilhelmina (moving in from the Eastern Division)
CVV Velocitas (moving in from the Western Division)

Eerste Klasse West:
UVV Utrecht

Divisions

Eerste Klasse East

Eerste Klasse South
Teams participating in the Eerste Klasse South would not play next season due to the mobilization. The league would resume one season later.

Eerste Klasse West

Championship play-off

References
RSSSF Netherlands Football League Championships 1898-1954
RSSSF Eerste Klasse Oost
RSSSF Eerste Klasse Zuid
RSSSF Eerste Klasse West

Netherlands Football League Championship seasons
1913–14 in Dutch football
Netherlands